ROH Field of Honor is a professional wrestling pay-per-view (PPV) event promoted by Ring of Honor (ROH) promotion since 2014. The three events took place in August at MCU Park in Brooklyn, New York. After the broadcast of the events, it was put on sale on DVD and through their Video on demand.

It should not be confused with the Field of Honor tournament that Ring of Honor ran in 2003.

Dates and venues

See also
ROH's annual events

References

External links
 Ring of Honor's official site